Cappella Maggiore is a comune in the province of Treviso, Veneto, northern-eastern Italy.

Twinning
 Earlston, United Kingdom, since 2004

Notable people
 Regina Dal Cin (1819 – 1897), Osteopath and bone-setter

References

Cities and towns in Veneto